Ahn Sanghak is a South Korean poet born in 1962. His poetry is based on the philosophy of constant change in life and nature and the harmony and dissonance of yin and yang. He emphasizes the importance of having hope for life through his poetry which is simple but deeply touching. Because of his second poetry collection , he is known as the "Andong soju poet." He served as the Secretary General of the Writers Association of Korea and the Kwon Jung Saeng Culture Foundation for Children.

Life 
The poet was born in 1962 in Andong, Gyeongsangbuk-do. All the report cards that he received during the six years of elementary school say that he always seemed blue and reticent. His dream at that time was to become a painter. As a teenager, he had a hard time since he and his stepmother did not get along. Then one day, he found an illustrated poem in his room by a high school girl named Ryu Hyang, which impressed him, and he became determined to become a writer. Since then, he began to study Korean national literature and popular literature and worked at an industrial complex in Daegu. After the great demonstration of workers that lasted from July to August, 1987, he focused on writing poetry.

His career as a poet started after the newspaper Joongang Ilbo published his poem  which depicts a grim landscape of the city in the 1980s. His second poetry collection  gave him his nickname "Andong soju poet." His children's poetry collection  came out in 2018.

He became the Secretary General of the Writers Association of Korea and took on the memorial project of sorting out the articles left by the deceased children's literature writer Kwon Jung Saeng. He participated in the establishment of the Kwon Jung Saeng Culture Foundation for Children from the spring of 2008, and worked as the foundation's Secretary General over six years until the summer of 2014. He received the Kwon Jung Saeng Writing Fund for his poem .

Writing

Style 
Ahn's poems do not usually feature a strong-voiced narrator, but they observe the changes in the everyday lives and the times, while emphasizing the importance of having hope for life. He mostly writes simple and easy poems, but they are very moving especially because he restrains from exhibiting his emotions too overtly.

Some of his poems depict his longing for the sister who died young of cancer and for those who are gone now, while others talk about the pains of the contemporary people. Also described are his grandmother who longs for her hometown, the poet himself who is missing something like his grandmother, and his consolations for the every living being in the world. With such compassion he ultimately pursues love, which is 'the desire to communicate,' by sublimating the pains of the contemporary people into humor and jokes. His poetry was acclaimed for its standout delineation of humanity and benevolence carried out in such a sincere manner, without any fancy expressions or rhetoric.

Major works 
Many of his poems are set in his hometown, Andong, like the poetry collection .

, his forth poetry collection, mostly deals with sympathy and longing. In the poem , the jokes thrown by farmers when they are tired from planting rice represent the virtue of caring and respecting the living things, which lets the readers know how people of the countryside live as a harmonious community. Poems including "" and  show how much he misses his father, and creates a warm and humble mood by depicting the friendliness of his father who never forgets to smile.

Works

Poetry collections 
, 1991 /  (Are You Safe and Sound), Hangilsa, 1991

, 1999 /  (Andong Soju), Silcheon Munhaksa, 1999

, 2003 /  (Old Postcards), Cheonnyeonui Sijak, 2003

, 2008 /  (Memories of Father), Aeji, 2008

, 2017 /  (The Person Came Back and I Wasn't There), Silcheon Munhaksa, 2017

Children's poetry collection 
, 2018 /  (Mom Who Drives the Planet), Changbi, 2018

Illustrated poetry collection 
, 2015 /  (Reading the Language of Flowers from Poetry), Silcheon Munhaksa, 2015

Biography 
, 2004 / , Korea Democracy Foundation, 2004

Works colloquialism in translation 
, 2018 / —K poet (Selected Poetry of Ahn Sang-hak), translated by Brother Anthony of Taizé, ASIA, 2018

Awards 
Gosan Literature Award Grand Prize (2015)

Kwon Jung Saeng Writing Fund (2016)

Dongsi Majung Literary Work Award (2018)

References 

21st-century South Korean poets
20th-century South Korean poets
South Korean male poets
1962 births
Living people